Illinois Route 153 is a north–south state road in southern Illinois. It runs from Illinois Route 154 in Eden to Illinois Route 15 in rural Washington County.

Route description 
Illinois 153 runs northeast from Eden to Coulterville, where it overlaps Illinois Route 13 through the central part of town. Illinois 153 is a rural, two-lane surface road for its entire length.

History 
SBI Route 153 originally ran from Eden to Irvington along what is now Illinois 153, Illinois Route 15, Illinois Route 127, and Illinois Route 177 to U.S. Route 51. In 1937 the above routes took over Illinois 153, and Illinois 153 was truncated to Illinois Route 160 in Plum Hill. In 1938 it was truncated further to its current northern end. The next year, Illinois 153 was extended south to Sparta; at some point in the future, this was dropped.

Major intersections

References 

153
Transportation in Randolph County, Illinois
Transportation in Washington County, Illinois